The 16th Iowa Infantry Regiment was an infantry regiment that served in the Union Army during the American Civil War.

Service
The 16th Iowa Infantry was organized at Davenport, Iowa, and mustered in for three years of Federal service by companies between December 10, 1861, and March 12, 1862.

The regiment was mustered out on July 19, 1865.

Iowa Brigade
After the Battle of Shiloh, the Thirteenth Iowa was assigned to the Third Brigade of the Sixth Division. The Brigade was composed of the Eleventh, Thirteenth, Fifteenth and Sixteenth regiments of Iowa Infantry, and was under command of Colonel Crocker. This organization remained intact until the close of the war. Except when upon detached duty, the operations of each of the regiments were identified very largely with those of the brigade, and, therefore, the history of each of these four Iowa regiments is almost inseparably interwoven with that of the brigade.

Total strength and casualties
The 16th Iowa mustered a total of 1,441 men over the span of its existence.
Seven officers and 94 enlisted men were killed in action or died of their wounds, while three officers and 219 enlisted men died of disease, for a total of 323 fatalities.

Commanders
Colonel Alexander Chambers

See also
List of Iowa Civil War Units
Iowa in the American Civil War

Notes

References
The Civil War Archive

Units and formations of the Union Army from Iowa
1861 establishments in Iowa
Military units and formations established in 1861
Military units and formations disestablished in 1865